James McDougal Hart (May 10, 1828 – October 24, 1901), was a Scottish-born American landscape and cattle painter of the Hudson River School.

Family and education
Hart was born in Kilmarnock, Scotland, and was taken to America with his family in early youth. His older brother, William Hart, was also a Hudson River School artist, as were his younger sister Julie Hart Beers and his two daughters, both figure painters, Letitia Bonnet Hart (1867 - Sept. 1953) and Mary Theresa Hart (1872–1942).

In Albany, New York he trained with a sign and carriage maker— possibly the same employer that had taken on his brother in his early career. James later returned to Europe for serious artistic training, studying in Munich and as a pupil of Friedrich Wilhelm Schirmer at the Kunstakademie Düsseldorf. He is associated with the Düsseldorf school of painting.

Career
Hart returned to America in 1853. He exhibited his first work at the National Academy of Design in 1848 and  became an associate in 1857 and a full member in 1859. He was particularly devoted to the National Academy, exhibiting there over a period of more than forty years and serving as vice president late in his life from 1895 to 1899. Like his brother William, James also exhibited at the Brooklyn Art Association (he lived for a time in Brooklyn) and at major exhibitions around the country.

Along with most of the major landscape artists of the time, Hart based his operations in New York City and adopted the style of the Hudson River School. While he and his brother William often painted similar landscape subjects, James may have been more inclined to paint exceptionally large works. An example is The Old Homestead (1862), 42 x 68 inches, in the collection of the High Museum of Art in Atlanta, Georgia. James may have been exposed to large paintings while studying in Düsseldorf, a center of realist art pedagogy that also shaped the practices of Albert Bierstadt and Worthington Whittredge.

Like his brother William, James excelled at painting cattle. Kevin J. Avery writes, "the bovine subjects that once distinguished [his works] now seem the embodiment of Hart's artistic complacency." (p. 250 in American Drawings and Watercolors in the Metropolitan Museum of Art, Volume I: A Catalogue of Works by Artists Born Before 1835) In contrast with the complacency of some of his cattle scenes, his major landscape paintings are considered important works of the Hudson River School. A particularly fine example is Summer in the Catskills, now in the Thyssen-Bornemisza Museum in Madrid, Spain.

Among Hart's students was the Hudson River School painter Evelina Mount.

Hart is interred at Green-Wood Cemetery in Brooklyn, New York.

Gallery

See also
List of Hudson River School artists
 Full biography of William and James M. Hart, Dr. Mark W. Sullivan and Seth I Rosen, The Hart Project
 Sullivan, Mark W. James M. and William Hart, American Landscape Painters. Philadelphia:  John Warren, 1983.
 Sabine Morgen: Die Ausstrahlung der Düsseldorfer Schule nach Amerika im 19. Jahrhundert. Düsseldorfer Bilder in Amerika und amerikanische Maler in Düsseldorf mit Künstlerlexikon auf CD-ROM, Edition Ruprecht, Göttingen 2008,  (= Göttinger Beiträge zur Kunstgeschichte, Band 2) [Hart's painting and biography discussed]

References

External links
Artwork by James McDougal Hart

1828 births
1901 deaths
Burials at Green-Wood Cemetery
People from Kilmarnock
19th-century American painters
American male painters
Hudson River School painters
Scottish emigrants to the United States
Animal artists
American landscape painters
19th-century American male artists
Düsseldorf school of painting